Dharanindra or commonly known as King Indra was the ruler of the Sailendra dynasty who was the Emperor of Mataram in Central Java and Srivijaya in South Sumatera.
Dharanindra was the successor of Panangkaran, he ruled the kingdom in the period 775—800. He was mentioned as a great conqueror and credited for Sailendra's overseas campaign.

He was mentioned in Kelurak inscription (dated 782) in his formal reign name Sri Sanggrama Dhananjaya. In this inscription he was hailed as Wairiwarawiramardana or "the slayer of courageous enemies". The similar title also found in Ligor B inscription discovered in Southern Thailand Malay Peninsula; Sarwwarimadawimathana, which suggest it referred to the same person. Dharanindra seems to be a warlike character, as he embarked on military naval expedition overseas and has brought Sailendras' control on Ligor in Malay Peninsula. After conquering and taking Ligor back from Water Chenla, he also launched raids against Champa in 774 and 770, and conquered Southern Cambodia in Mekong delta in early 9th century. During this time, Jayavarman II from Java, was probably the commander of the Śailendra (Srivijaya) army. At the behest of Maharaja of Srivijaya (Dharaindra), Jayavarman II was installed as a new Cambodia king and Angkor Dynasty was founded.

King Indra seems to continue the builder tradition of his predecessor. He continued and completed the construction of Manjusrigrha temple, and according to the Karangtengah inscription (dated 824) responsible for the construction of Venuvana temple, connected to Mendut or probably Ngawen temple. He was also probably responsible for the conception, planning and initiate the construction of Borobudur and Pawon temple.

References

Indonesian Buddhist monarchs
Shailendra dynasty
Srivijaya
8th-century Indonesian people